Saint-Maur-sur-Loire is a village of western France in the département of Maine-et-Loire on the river Loire, part of the commune of Gennes-Val-de-Loire, about  downstream from Saumur.

History
Here allegedly Saint Maurus (but probably someone else) founded towards the middle of the 6th century Glanfeuil Abbey, the first Benedictine monastery in Gaul.

It was later reduced to ruins by the Normans; in anticipation of the disaster the relics of the saint were transferred to the abbey of Fosses (afterwards Saint-Maur-des-Fossés). Saint-Maur-sur-Loire was afterwards restored and fortified; the extant remains consist of a part of the church (12th and 17th centuries) and buildings of the 17th and 18th centuries.

Saint-Maur was an independent commune until 1840, when it became part of Saint-Georges-des-Sept-Voies. In 1873, it became part of Le Thoureil, which was merged into Gennes-Val-de-Loire in 2016.

Sources and references

 
 Catholic Encyclopaedia- Odo of Glanfeuil

External links
 Webpage about the abbey (in French)
 Information about the abbey (in French)
 Pictures of the abbey

Villages in Pays de la Loire